Fake was a Swedish synthpop band during the 1980s.

History
Fake was formed when two Swedish musicians, Erik Strömblad and Stefan Bogstedt, founded their own band, then called Size 46, in 1977. The band grew over the next few years, with metal drummer Stefan Sverin and singers Tony Wilhelmsson and Ulrika Örn being added to the lineup, and with more synthesizers added to their rock music sound. Stefan Sverin moved on as a session drummer for various acts such as American actor Cliff Taylor and Claes Muncktell from Dave and the Mistakes. He has since gave up drumming and is now working as an Art Director in Stockholm.

The group's second single, "Donna Rouge", was a major hit in Italy and the remix became a disco classic. The band performed on the Discoring television show in 1985 and Festivalbar in 1985. An album, New Art, was released in 1984. Another single, "Brick", was released a year later and was also a big success internationally, reaching #1 in Italy and #6 in France.

After the recording of "Brick", the band split up, but in 2001, plans were made for a reformation.

Discography

Album
New Art (1984)

Singles
"Dreamgirl"/"Warlord" (1981)
"Donna Rouge" (1983)
"Right" (1984)
"Memories of Pan"/"Frogs in Spain" (1984)
"Arabian Toys" (1984)
"Brick" (1985)

References

External links
 Video clip of "Another Brick" 1985 (YouTube)
Fake unofficial site

Swedish new wave musical groups
Swedish electronic music groups